The 2020 United States presidential election in Montana was held on Tuesday, November 3, 2020, as part of the 2020 United States presidential election in which all 50 states plus the District of Columbia participated. Montana voters chose electors to represent them in the Electoral College via a popular vote, pitting the Republican Party's nominee, incumbent President Donald Trump and running mate Vice President Mike Pence, against Democratic Party nominee, former Vice President Joe Biden, and his running mate California Senator Kamala Harris. Montana has three electoral votes in the Electoral College.

Trump won Montana 56.9% to 40.5%, a margin of 16.4%, down from the 20.4% margin he scored four years earlier. Prior to this election, most news organizations considered this a state Trump was very likely to win, or otherwise considered a likely red state. Montana has not been won by a Democrat since 1992, and has only been competitive in two elections since then, namely in 1996 and in 2008. 

Despite his loss in the state, Biden was able to flip Blaine County, a bellwether that is home to Fort Belknap Indian Reservation. He also narrowed Trump's margins in 31 other counties, including the counties of Lewis and Clark (Helena, the state capital), and to a lesser extent Roosevelt, which holds most of Fort Peck Reservation. This is the first time since their creation in 1919 and 1912, respectively, that a Democrat has won a presidential election without carrying Roosevelt or Hill county.

Primary elections
The primary elections were held on June 2, 2020.

Republican primary

Donald Trump ran unopposed in the Republican primary, and thus received all of the state's 27 delegates to the 2020 Republican National Convention.

Democratic primary

Libertarian nominee
The 2020 Libertarian National Convention was held on May 22–24, 2020, selecting Jo Jorgensen, Psychology Senior Lecturer at Clemson University, as their presidential nominee.

General election

Predictions

Polling

Graphical summary

Aggregate polls

Polls

Donald Trump vs. Michael Bloomberg

Donald Trump vs. Steve Bullock

Donald Trump vs. Pete Buttigieg

Donald Trump vs. Kamala Harris

Donald Trump vs. Amy Klobuchar

Donald Trump vs. Bernie Sanders

Donald Trump vs. Elizabeth Warren

Donald Trump vs. Generic Democrat

with Cory Booker, Kirsten Gillibrand, Kamala Harris, John Kasich, Beto O'Rourke, Bernie Sanders, Howard Schultz and Elizabeth Warren

Electoral slates
These slates of electors were nominated by each party in order to vote in the Electoral College should their candidate win the state:

Results

By county

Counties that flipped from Republican to Democratic
 Blaine (largest city: Chinook)

By congressional district
Montana has one at-large district that is the same as the statewide results.

Analysis
Montana, a sparsely-populated state straddling the Mountain and Plains West, has been a red state on the presidential level from 1968 on, voting solidly Republican in the close elections of 1968, 2000, 2004, 2012, and 2016. Since 1964, it has voted Democratic only in 1992, and, aside from that, has been competitive only in 1976, 1988, 1996, and 2008. Montana typically votes substantially to the left of its neighbors in the Mountain West (Idaho and Wyoming) and, more recently, of its neighbors in the Plains West as well (North and South Dakota). Nevertheless, Trump was able to carry the state comfortably on Election Day, although his margin was reduced with respect to 2016. 

Trump's principal bases of support were in Glacier Country, southwest Montana, central Montana, and southeast Montana, where he carried the population centers of Flathead County (Kalispell), Ravalli County, Cascade County (Great Falls), and Yellowstone County (Billings), in every case with a higher vote share than he received statewide. He also performed strongly in moderate-size, more rural counties in every region of the state, such as Lincoln and Sanders in Glacier Country, Beaverhead, Madison, and Jefferson in the southwest, Stillwater and Carbon in south central Montana, Fergus in central Montana, Custer in the southeast, and Richland, Dawson, and Valley in the Missouri River Country.

However, Biden was able to keep the margin smaller than in neighboring states by breaking 60% in Missoula County, the state's second-largest county and home to the University of Montana, and winning a majority in Gallatin County, the state's third-largest county and home to Montana State University. Gallatin had been a typically Republican county as recently as 2012, when it voted for Romney. He also held Trump to a 4% margin in Lewis and Clark County, the state's sixth-largest county and home to the state capital, Helena; George W. Bush had won this county twice by double digits. Biden also held onto the traditionally Democratic strongholds of heavily unionized Silver Bow and Deer Lodge Counties, although he still fell short of the typical Democratic vote share in those counties; Trump became the first Republican to crack 40% in Silver Bow since 1956, and got the highest vote share of any Republican in Deer Lodge since 1956. In addition, he once again carried majority-Native American Glacier County; and furthered his margins in the city of Whitefish, located in heavily-Republican Flathead County.

Biden flipped the swing county of Blaine; Trump flipped no counties. 

Per exit polls by the Associated Press, 49% of voters favored allowing more drilling and mining for natural resources on Montana's public lands; an overwhelming 87% of them backed Trump.

In addition to Trump's victory in Montana, Republican candidates, riding on his coattails, won three other major statewide races, which were expected to be competitive. Incumbent Senator Steve Daines defeated term-limited Governor Steve Bullock in the Montana Senate race, Republican State Auditor Matt Rosendale defeated former state representative Kathleen Williams in the Montana House race, and Republican Representative Greg Gianforte defeated Lt. Gov. Mike Cooney in the governor's race. This marked the first time since 2000 that Montana Republicans have held a trifecta.

See also
 United States presidential elections in Montana
 Presidency of Joe Biden
 2020 United States presidential election
 2020 Democratic Party presidential primaries
 2020 Libertarian Party presidential primaries
 2020 Republican Party presidential primaries
 2020 United States elections

Notes

Partisan clients

References

Further reading

External links
 
 
  (State affiliate of the U.S. League of Women Voters)
 

Montana
2020
Presidential